Ente Upasana is a 1984 Malayalam film, directed by Bharathan, written by Thoppil Bhasi, starring Mammootty and Suhasini. The film is based on the award-winning novel Upasana by Mallika Yunis. The film was remade in Telugu as Karpoora Deepam (2012) starring Murali Mohan, Suhasini and Sharat Babu. The film was a commercial success.

Plot
Lathika is a working single mother of a son named Jagadish.  Her flashback  reveals a happy life in her village with her widowed mother and her cousin Sreekumar, his parents, her uncle, aunt and their grandmother. She is in love with her cousin who works in the Gulf and they are engaged to be married. Sreekumar leaves for the Gulf after a trip back home, and Lathika waits for the day of his return and their impending marriage. Arjunan, a close friend's brother on a fateful rainy day drives Lathika home in his car, but the former can not control his feelings and hence rapes her.  Lathika becomes pregnant. She moves to a big city to give birth to the child, and her mother passes away due to the shock.

Back to the present, Lathika meets Arjunan, who is now her boss. She and her best friend live together in a hostel. One day Lathika's son contracts fever and is hospitalised. He is moved from the common ward to a private room by Arjunan. Latikha rushes to the room and is taken aback to see first Arjunan and later his mother arrive to take care of her son.

One day by chance her ex-lover (cousin) Sreekumar finds out about Lathika's tribulations after he left for the Gulf, and in anger he beats up Arjunan. Sreekumar apologizes to Lathika and asks her to attend his own wedding. Lathika returns to her hometown and reunites with her aunt and grandmother. She is visited by Arjunan in her hometown and finally they live together as a family with her son.

Cast
 Mammootty as Arjunan
 Suhasini as Lathika
 Nahas Shah as Sreekumar, Lathika's cousin
 Nedumudi Venu as Lathika's uncle
 Unnimary as Lekha
 Meena Joseph as Arjunan's mother
 K. P. A. C. Lalitha as Gauri, Lathika's aunt
 Cochin Hanifa as  Doctor
 Sabitha Anand as Arjunan's sister

Soundtrack
The music was composed by Johnson and the lyrics were written by Poovachal Khader.

References

External links
 

1984 films
1984 drama films
1980s Malayalam-language films
Films directed by Bharathan
Films based on Indian novels
Films with screenplays by Thoppil Bhasi
Films scored by Johnson
Malayalam films remade in other languages
Films based on Malayalam novels